Machuelo Abajo is one of the 31 barrios of the municipality of Ponce, Puerto Rico.  Along with Canas Urbano, Magueyes Urbano, Portugués Urbano, and San Antón, Machuelo Abajo is one of the municipality's five originally rural barrios that are now also part of the urban zone of the city of Ponce. It was founded in 1818.

Location
Machuelo Abajo is an urban barrio located in the southern section of the municipality, in the northeast portion of the city of Ponce, within the Ponce city limits, at latitude 18.024217 N, and longitude -66.600217 W.

Boundaries
Machuelo Abajo is bounded on the North by Tito Castro Avenue/PR-14 (roughly), on the South by Miguel Pou Boulevard (roughly), and Abaisin Street, on the West by Rio Portugues, and on the East by Los Negrones Hill, Rio Bucana, and Emilio Fagot Street (roughly).

In terms of barrio-to-barrio boundaries, Machuelo Abajo is bounded in the North by Machuelo Arriba, in the South by San Anton and Sabanetas, in the West by  Quinto and Sexto, and in the East by Sabanetas.

Features and demographics

Machuelo Abajo is home to the communities of Jardines Fagot, La Rambla, La Alhambra, Extension La Alhambra, Flamboyanes, Bella Vista, Santa Clara, and Riberas del Bucana. In addition the communities of Residencial Dr. Pila, Villa Esperanza, and Valle Verde, make their home there as well.

In 2000, the population of Machuelo Abajo was 13,302 persons, and it had a density of 7,522 persons per square mile.

In 2010, the population of Machuelo Abajo was 11,855 persons, and it had a density of 6,622.9 persons per square mile.

The highest point in Barrio Machuelo Abajo is Cerro Los Negrones at 397 feet, located northwest of Mercedita Airport.

Notable Landmarks
Río Bucaná runs a stretch of its course (channelized) through barrio Machuelo Abajo. The new Hospital San Lucas is located in Machuelo Abajo where the old Ponce District Hospital was located on Puerto Rico Highway 14.

Notable people from Machuelo Abajo
 Pedro Albizu Campos
 Marta Romero
 Héctor Lavoe

See also

 List of communities in Puerto Rico

References

External links

Barrio Machuelo Abajo
1831 establishments in Puerto Rico